Abbas Khan (1 July 1911 – 27 January 2002) was a cricketer who played for Sind, Muslims, Karachi and India in First class cricket.

References

External links
CricketArchive player profile

1911 births
2002 deaths
Indian cricketers
Pakistani cricketers